This is a list of Registered Historic Places in Barrington, Rhode Island, which has been transferred from and is an integral part of National Register of Historic Places listings in Bristol County, Rhode Island

|}

See also

National Register of Historic Places listings in Bristol County, Rhode Island
List of National Historic Landmarks in Rhode Island

References

N
.
.
Barrington
Barrington, Rhode Island